Coventry North West is a constituency in the city of Coventry represented in the House of Commons of the UK Parliament since 2019 by Taiwo Owatemi of the Labour Party.

Members of Parliament

Boundaries

1997–present: The City of Coventry wards of Bablake, Holbrook, Radford, Sherbourne, Whoberley, and Woodlands

1983–1997: The City of Coventry wards of Bablake, Holbrook, Radford, and Sherbourne

1974–1983: The County Borough of Coventry wards of Bablake, Holbrook, Radford, and Sherbourne

History
The area's electorate has roughly grown in line with national trends, leading to minimal boundary changes and has elected Labour MPs at every election since its first election in February 1974.

In 2019, the long-time incumbent Geoffrey Robinson retired, and at the ensuing general election the Conservatives achieved a swing of more than 8% in their favour, with the Labour majority falling to three figures for the first time in the seat's history.

Elections

Elections in the 2010s

Elections in the 2000s

Elections in the 1990s

Elections in the 1980s

Elections in the 1970s

See also 
 List of parliamentary constituencies in the West Midlands (county)

Notes

References

Parliamentary constituencies in Coventry
Constituencies of the Parliament of the United Kingdom established in 1974